Strike Back: Retribution is a ten-part British-American action television series, and serves as the sixth series and second revamp of Strike Back, with a new cast including Daniel MacPherson, Warren Brown, Roxanne McKee and Alin Sumarwata. The series premiered on 31 October 2017 on Sky One in the United Kingdom and 2 February 2018 on Cinemax in the United States.

The series focuses on Section 20, a clandestine multinational Special Forces team. Section 20 has been re-formed after the events of Legacy and placed under new leadership. The team is tasked with locating notorious terrorist Omar Idrisi and his British wife, Jane Lowry, before they can seemingly start a terrorist attack against the West.

Cast
Section 20
Daniel MacPherson as Sergeant Samuel Wyatt, US Joint Special Operations Command
Warren Brown as Sergeant Thomas "Mac" McAllister, British Army (former United Kingdom Special Forces)
Roxanne McKee as Captain Natalie Reynolds, British Army (former Special Reconnaissance Regiment)
Alin Sumarwata as Lance Corporal Gracie Novin, Australian Army Special Operations Command
Nina Sosanya as Colonel Adeena Donovan, British Army, the commanding officer of the revived Section 20
Phil Dunster as Lance Corporal Will Jensen, British Army Intelligence Corps

Special Guest
Philip Winchester as Michael Stonebridge, former Special Boat Service operator and Section 20 operative, who disappeared after the events of Strike Back: Legacy.
Sullivan Stapleton as Damien Scott, former Delta Force operator and Section 20 operative, who disappeared after the events of Strike Back: Legacy. 

Military officials
Corey Johnson as Colonel Parker,  US Joint Special Operations Command
 Selva Rasalingam as General Ajeeb Farid, leader of a breakaway section of the Libyan National Army
Attilla Árpa as Major General László, Hungarian TEK (the character previously appeared in Strike Back: Project Dawn)
Louise Gold as Crowther, Section 20's superior based in Whitehall
Scott Young as Director Mikhailov, Russian GRU

Antagonists
Don Hany as Omair Idrisi, the renowned leader of a terrorist group
Katherine Kelly as Jane Lowry, Idrisi's radicalised wife
Trevor Eve as Morgan Ives, an international arms dealer dealing with Idrisi
Adrian Bouchet as Johannes Krieger, the head of Octagon, a private military company owned by Ives
Kelly Gough as Rosa Varga, the leader of Magyar Ultra, a white nationalist organisation
Mark Strepan as Josef Varga, the younger brother of Rosa and second-in-command of Magyar Ultra
Daniel Cerqueira as Dr. Kamil Markov, a Chechen chemical weapons scientist
Peter Firth as Milos  Borisovich, a Belarusian drug lord

Episodes

Production
On December 8, 2016, Cinemax and Sky1 announced they had greenlit a brand new series of Strike Back with a brand new cast, no longer focusing on former stars Sullivan Stapleton and Philip Winchester. Daniel MacPherson, Alin Sumarwata, Roxanne McKee and Warren Brown have been cast to star in the new series instead. 

MacPherson as  Sergeant Samuel Wyatt, a bar-room philosopher who works best alone and has no intention of being dragged into a team situation.
Sumarwata as Lance Corporal Gracie Novin, a gear-head who is looking to make the step up. Genuine, honest to the point of bluntness, she’s the heart and soul of the team.
McKee as Captain Natalie Reynolds, who comes from a military family, excels at psychological profiles and seeking weaknesses in others, although she might be blinded to her own fault-lines.
Brown as  Sergeant Thomas “Mac” Macallister, a man of his word, affable, physically capable, and driven by a desire to avenge the team he’s lost.

The new series focused on the now disavowed and disbanded Section 20 that is restored in order to track down a notorious terrorist following a brutal prison break. Tasked with covert military intelligence and high-risk operations, the resurrected unit embarks on a lethal manhunt that would uncover a vast web of interconnected criminal activity. As the team journeys across the Middle East and Europe, they uncover a deadly conspiracy which threatens to overwhelm them all and change the face of modern warfare forever.

The new series was written by Jack Lothian who also served as showrunner and executive producer with Andy Harries and Sharon Hughff for Left Bank Pictures. M. J. Bassett served as director and executive producer, Bill Shephard as producer. The new Strike Back  series was filmed sometime in 2017. The new series  debuted in the UK on Sky One on October 31, 2017 and in the US on Cinemax on February 2, 2018.

On February 13, 2018, it was announced that former stars Sullivan Stapleton and Philip Winchester would reprise their roles as Damien Scott and Michael Stonebridge for two special guest appearances later in the new series.

References

External links
 Strike Back at Sky1
 Strike Back at Cinemax
 

2017 British television seasons
2018 American television seasons
2018 British television seasons
Strike Back (TV series)